Fionnghuala (reformed spelling: Fionnuala) is an Irish language female given name.

Fionnghuala was a highly popular woman's name in medieval Ireland. It continues to be used, as well as in the forms Fionnuala and Nuala. The meaning of Fionnghuala is 'fair-shouldered', which is interpreted as fair headed.

Bearers of the name

 Fionnghuala Ní Conchobhair, Princess of Connacht, died 1247. 
 Fionnghuala Ní Briain, died 1282.
 Fionnghuala Ní Máel Sechnaill, Abbess of Meath, died 1286.
 Fionnghuala Ní Chonchobair, Abbess of Killcrevanty, died 1301.
 Fionnghuala Ní Choncobuir, died 1306.
 Fionnghuala Ní Conchobair, died 1335.
 Fionnghuala Ní Fhingin, died 1344.
 Fionnghuala Ní Mail Shechlainn, Queen of Breifne, died 1347.
 Fionnghuala Ní Cheallaigh, Lady of Clanricarde, died 1380.
 Fionnghuala Ní Chatháin, died 1381. 
 Fionnghuala Ní Uidhir, died 1382.
 Fionnghuala Ní Conchobuir, died 1392.
 Fionnghuala Bean Uí Eaghra, died 1398.
 Fionnghuala Ní Madadhan, died 1398.
 Fionnghuala Bean Uí Suibne Fanad, died 1400.
 Fionnghuala Bean Uí Cellaigh, Queen of Uí Maine, died 1403.
 Fionnghuala Ní Ragnaill, died 1418.
 Fionnghuala Ní Dochartaigh, died 1440.
 Fionnghuala Níc in Airchideochain, died 1479.
 Fionnghuala Ní Diarmata Ruaidh, died 1489.
 Fionnghuala Ní Con Mara, died 1490.
 Fionnghuala Ní Conchubhair Fáilghe, died 1447.
 Fionnghuala Níc Uidhir, died 1496.
 Fionnghuala Ní Donnchada, died 1505.
 Fionnghuala Ní Briain, Queen of Tír Chonaill, died 1428.
 Fionnghuala Ní Craith, died 1531.
 Fionnghuala O'Reilly, born 1994, Irish model

Other uses
 Fionnghuala (Dungeons & Dragons), a fictional deity

See also
List of Irish-language given names

External links
 http://medievalscotland.org/kmo/AnnalsIndex/Feminine/Fionnghuala.shtml

Irish-language feminine given names